The third season of NYPD Blue premiered on ABC on October 24, 1995, and concluded on May 21, 1996.

Episodes

References

External links

NYPD Blue seasons
1995 American television seasons
1996 American television seasons